Jailbirds is a 1940 British comedy crime film directed by Oswald Mitchell and starring Albert Burdon, Harry Terry and Charles Farrell. It was based on a theatrical sketch by Fred Karno.

Plot summary
After escaping from prison two criminals attempt to hide stolen jewels in a loaf of bread. However it accidentally gets sent to the wrong house leading to their ultimate capture.

Cast
 Albert Burdon - Bill Smith
 Harry Terry - Narky
 Shaun Glenville - Col. Pepper
 Charles Farrell - Spike Nelson
 Charles Hawtrey - Nick
 Lorraine Clewes - Mary Smith
 Sylvia Coleridge - Mrs. Smith
 Cyril Chamberlain - Bob
 Nat Mills - Mr. Popodopoulos
 Bobbie MacCauley - Mrs. Popodopoulos

Critical reception
TV Guide called it "Funnier than most British comedies of the time," and rated it two out of four stars.

References

External links

1940 films
1940s crime comedy films
Films directed by Oswald Mitchell
British crime comedy films
British black-and-white films
1940 comedy films
Films scored by Percival Mackey
1940s English-language films
1940s British films